International School of Bucharest (ISB) is a private international school founded in 1996 that offers a British style of education for students from the age of 2.5 to 19 in Bucharest, Romania's capital city. It caters to over 700 students from 40 countries.

Education 
Children in the Early Years, Primary (Key Stages 1 and 2) and Secondary school (Key Stage 3) follow the National Curriculum of England and Wales, supplemented with the Cambridge Primary and Secondary 1 Curriculum for the core subjects English, Maths and Science. Year 12 and 13 are the final two years where students are prepared for International Baccalaureate. Years 10 and 11 follow the Cambridge IGCSE.

ISB has been registered by the University of Cambridge as a 'Cambridge International Examinations' center since 2001 and accredited by the Council of International Schools (CIS) since August 2012. ISB has been a member of COBIS since October 2013.

References 

International schools in Bucharest
International Baccalaureate schools
Educational institutions established in 1996
1996 establishments in Romania